The 2nd Chicago Film Critics Association Awards were announced on March 8, 1990 at an awards ceremony held in The Pump Room. They honor achievements in 1989 filmmaking. Twenty-seven of the CFCA members voted for the awards. Do the Right Thing earned three accolades, including Best Film, and its director Spike Lee commented that the awards made up for the lack of nominations at that year's Academy Awards. Actress Laura San Giacomo received two awards for her role as Cynthia Patrice Bishop in Sex, Lies, and Videotape.

Winners
The winners for the 27nd Chicago Film Critics Association Awards are as follows:

Best Actor
Tom Cruise – Born on the Fourth of July

Best Actress
Michelle Pfeiffer – The Fabulous Baker Boys

Best Director
Spike Lee – Do the Right Thing

Best Film 
Do the Right Thing

Best Foreign Film
Henry V

Best Supporting Actor
Danny Aiello – Do the Right Thing

Best Supporting Actress 
Laura San Giacomo – Sex, Lies, and Videotape

Most Promising Actor
John Cusack – Say Anything...

Most Promising Actress
Laura San Giacomo – Sex, Lies, and Videotape

References

External links
1988–97 Awards at the Chicago Film Critics Association
1989 Awards at the Internet Movie Database

 1989
1989 film awards